The Military Ordinariate of Venezuela is a Latin Church military ordinariate of the Catholic Church. Immediately exempt to the Holy See, it provides pastoral care to Catholics serving in the Venezuelan Armed Forces and their families.

History
The military ordinary was established by Pope John Paul II on 31 October 1995.

Military ordinaries
 Marcial Augusto Ramírez Ponce (appointed 11 February 1996 – retired 19 December 2000)
 José Hernán Sánchez Porras (19 December 2000 – 13 October 2014)
Benito Adán Méndez Bracamonte (8 June 2015 – present)

See also
 Roman Catholicism in Venezuela

References

External links
 Military Ordinariate of Venezuela (Catholic-Hierarchy) 
 Ordinariato Militar de Venezuela (GCatholic.org)

Venezuela
Venezuela
1995 establishments in Venezuela